Kalyani Varadarajan (8 October 1923 – 28 October 2003), commonly known as Kalyani, was one of Carnatic music's famous twentieth-century composers. She created carnatic compositions in all 72 melakarta ragas, besides scores of janya ragas.

Early life

Kalyani Varadarajan was born to Sriman Nadadoor Ammal Narasimhachariar and Srimati Singarammal. Her father was a big scholar in Telugu and Sanskrit languages, who served as a teacher, headmaster and finally as educational inspector, while her mother was a musician. Kalyani had a taste to write and compose songs since a young age, and she underwent vocal and Veena training, first under her mother and later under other able gurus. Thereafter, she learnt to play Violin. She had her debut in Veena performance at the age of 16 in 1942.

List of Compositions

External links
The author of Musical heritage of India notes the superiority of Kalyani Varadarajan's Carnatic compositions and places it on par with great composers in the field
Select Kritis - Vedanta Spiritual Library
Books and CD of Kalyani Varadarajan's Kritis released
Mention of Kalyani Varadarajan's trip to the United States https://timesofindia.indiatimes.com/life-style/spotlight/of-kanjeevarams-kaapi-and-carnatic-music-in-cleveland/articleshow/63831515.cms
Kalyani Varadarajan mentioned as one of the top woman composer of carnatic kritis https://www.thehindu.com/entertainment/music/what-women-wrote/article34273199.ece

References

Carnatic composers
Carnatic musicians
Bhakti movement
20th-century Indian musicians